Dimitra Asilian (born July 10, 1972 in Piraeus) is a retired female Greek water polo player and Olympic silver medalist with the Greece women's national water polo team.

She received a silver medal at the 2004 Summer Olympics in Athens.

She scored 8 goals at the 1999 Women's European Water Polo Championship in Prato, where Greece finished 5th.

At club level, Asilian started swimming at Greek powerhouse Olympiacos youth Academy at the age of 6. Olympiacos women's water polo department was founded in 1988 and Asilian went on to play for Olympiacos for a total of 29 years (including her youth career) before her retirement at the end of 2006–2007 season at age 35. Asilian is the record goalscorer in the history of the Greek Women's Water Polo League with 703 goals, a record she achieved in a 15-year span (1992–2007). She won 2 Greek Championships (1994–95, 1997–98) and the fourth place in the 1995–96 LEN European Cup with Olympiacos.

See also
 List of Olympic medalists in water polo (women)

References

External links
 

1972 births
Living people
Greek female water polo players
Olympic water polo players of Greece
Olympiacos Women's Water Polo Team players
Water polo players at the 2004 Summer Olympics
Olympic silver medalists for Greece
Olympic medalists in water polo
Greek people of Armenian descent
Medalists at the 2004 Summer Olympics
Water polo players from Piraeus
21st-century Greek women